Zavolzhye may refer to:
Transvolga, a territory to the east of the Volga River in Russia
Zavolzhye Urban Settlement, a municipal formation which the town of district significance of Zavolzhye in Gorodetsky District of Nizhny Novgorod Oblast, Russia is incorporated as
Zavolzhye (inhabited locality), several inhabited localities in Russia